Pen Argyl Area High School is a for-year public high school located in Pen Argyl, Pennsylvania in the Lehigh Valley region of eastern Pennsylvania. It is the only high school in the Pen Argyl Area School District. As of the 2021-22 school year, the school had an enrollment of 518 students, according to National Center for Education Statistics data.

The school's colors are green and white and its mascot is the Green Knight.

Athletics

The school's athletic teams belong to the PIAA's District XI and are a member of the Colonial League.

PIAA District XI championships
Football: 

1984, 1986 (Class A)

2001, 2011, 2012 (Class AA)

Teams
Boys Sports 

Baseball -  AAA
Basketball -  AAAA
Cross Country - AA
Football - AAA
Golf - AA
Soccer AA
Tennis - AA
Track and field - AA
Wrestling - AA

Girls Sports 
Basketball - AAA
Cheer - AAAAAA
Cross Country - AA
Field hockey - A
Soccer - AA
Softball - AAA
Tennis - AA
Track and Field - AA

Rivalry
Pen Argyl has been involved in a long-standing rivalry with Bangor Area High School. The football rivalry between these two teams is arguably the most well known aspect of this rivalry. The game was initially played on Thanksgiving Day, but this tradition ended in the mid-1970s. It is now the regular season finale for both teams.  The to teams first met on the football field in 1920, with 2016 marking the 97th meeting between the Green Knights and the Slaters. Despite a decent size difference between the two schools, Pen Argyl leads the overall series 50-44-4. They have won 16 of the last 18 meetings.

Athletic facilities

The Green Knights football team has their home games at Alumni Stadium, located on the high school campus. The stadium has a cement based home section, stretching from goal line to goal line and rising 20 rows above the field. A smaller visitors section was installed on the other side of the field in the early to mid 2000s. The stadium is also known as "The Hill" because it is located on top of a short but steep hill. Alumni Stadium is one of only two football fields in the Colonial League not have stadium lights; the other is Wilson Area High School). As a result, home games are played on Saturday afternoons.

Recently, the school refinished and updated their gymnasium floor with a new Green Knight design, donated by the class of 2010.

References

External links
Pen Argyl Area High School official website
Pen Argyl Area High School athletics
Pen Argyl Area High School on Facebook
Pen Argyl Area High School on Twitter
Pen Argyl Area High School athletics on Twitter
Pen Argyl Area High School sports coverage at The Express-Times

1899 establishments in Pennsylvania
Educational institutions established in 1899
Public high schools in Pennsylvania
Schools in Northampton County, Pennsylvania